Fox Drive is a short expressway in south-west Edmonton, Alberta. It is used by motorists travelling from points in west and south-west areas of the city to destinations in central Edmonton, including: the University of Alberta, Old Strathcona, and the downtown core. It connects Whitemud Drive with Belgravia Road.

It begins at Whitemud Drive at the southern approaches to Quesnell Bridge, then crosses Whitemud Creek after providing access to Fort Edmonton Park. Fox Drive then has access to the Whitemud Equine Centre. It turns north-east to follow the contours of Whitemud Park, then south-east uphill, away from the North Saskatchewan River, to end at Belgravia Road/122 Street.

It retains the status of an expressway due to the intersection with Keillor Road, an uncontrolled intersection.

Major intersections
This is a list of major intersections, starting at the west end of Fox Drive.

See also

 Transportation in Edmonton

References

Roads in Edmonton